The Coulomb operator, named after Charles-Augustin de Coulomb, is a quantum mechanical operator used in the field of quantum chemistry.  Specifically, it is a term found in the Fock operator.  It is defined as:

where

 is the one-electron Coulomb operator defining the repulsion resulting from electron j,

 is the one-electron wavefunction of the  electron being acted upon by the Coulomb operator,

 is the one-electron wavefunction of the  electron,

See also
Core Hamiltonian
Exchange operator

References

Quantum chemistry
Theoretical chemistry
Computational chemistry